Hany Hassan Abou Rida (born 14 August 1953) is the former president of Egyptian Football Association, a member of the FIFA Council (since 2009) and a member of CAF Executive Committee, until he was pressured by the public to resign from his presidential position, after Egypt’s AFCON 2019 loss against South Africa, which he did on July 6, 2019.

Early life
Hany Abo Rida was born on 14 August 1953 in Port Said, Egypt. At a young age he began to play football with Elmasry Club, but he had a serious injury which led him to leave the football ground.  He studied Engineering, and running own business since 1979. In 1991, he became a member of Egyptian Football Association Board. In 2004, he started his career in FIFA. He later became the president of Egyptian Football Association from 2016 to 2019.

Professional career 
 Football player, Egyptian Football Association; Board member 1989–2019 
 LOC Vice President – 1997 FIFA U-17 World Championship 
 LOC President – 2009 FIFA U-20 World Cup
 LOC President – CAN 2006 
 CAF President – 2011 CAF U-23 Championship
 FIFA Council member - since May 2017

See also
 FIFA Council
 Egyptian Football Association
 CAF

References

External links
 Official Website in Arabic

1953 births
FIFA officials
Football people in Egypt
Living people
People from Port Said